Olga Florence Edwardes Davenport (20 May 1915 – 23 July 2008) was a South African-born British actress and artist.

Personal life

Her father was Joseph Michael Solomon (1883–1920), an architect partner of Herbert Baker, but he committed suicide in 1920 at the age of 33, in Cape Town.

Her mother was Jean Elizabeth Emily Cox née Hamilton (1885–1946), a South African actress, who was a divorcée (at least twice) when she married Solomon in 1914 in Cape Town. They also had a son, Paul Lionel Joseph (1918–1987).

Her mother married again in Cape Town in 1922 to Hugh Edwards (1887-?), a company secretary, who thus became the stepfather of Olga and Paul.

Olga Edwardes married P/O Anthony Max Baerlein in 1941, but he was killed in action later the same year.

In 1946, she married her second husband Nicholas Davenport, an economist and journalist who was more than twenty years her senior. He died in 1979; she died in Elstree in 2008.

Years 1930–1956

Olga Edwards, or maybe Olga Solomon, first exhibited paintings in Cape Town at aged about 15.   A year later, she came to England with her mother and her brother, where she wanted to study painting, acting and ballet, and danced in the corps de ballet in a company of Anton Dolin.

Edwardes appeared in several films and plays from the mid-1930s into the mid-1950s.

Filmography

Theatre work
Repertory
 This is where Edwardes learned stagecraft.  In Oxford rep there is a new play every week, including one that she took a bow in Romeo and Juliet with John Byron.
 In the Royal Shakespeare Company, during the first half of 1936, at the new Memorial Theatre, Stratford-on-Avon:
{| style="line-height:1.25;"
| style="width:12em;font-style:italic;" | Twelfth Night
| style="width:8em;"| Olivia
|-
| style="font-style:italic;" | Much Ado About Nothing || Hero
|-
| style="font-style:italic;" | The Taming of the Shrew || Bianca
|-
| style="font-style:italic;" | The Rivals || Julia Melville
|-
| style="font-style:italic;" | Richard II || Queen Isabella
|-
| style="font-style:italic;" | The Tempest || Miranda
|-
| style="font-style:italic;" | The Merchant of Venice || Jessica
|}
 During the war, she spent a year with the BBC Repertory Company.

West End
 As You Like It – Open Air 1934 – the stage débuts of Olga Edwardes and Frank Tickle
 Party 1860 – Open Air 1934
 Androcles and the Lion – Open Air 1934 – George Bernard Shaw watched it on its first night
 Romeo and Juliet – Open Air 1934
 Young Madame Conti – Savoy 1936
 Tsar Lenin – Westminster Theatre, 1936 – 1937
 Peril at End House, "Nick" Buckley, opened at Brighton, then Richmond and then moved to Vaudeville but only 38 performances in May 1940
 Twelfth Night – just two matinees for Twelfth Night holiday, on 30 Dec 1940 and 31 Dec 1940
 Landslide, Marian, Westminster – opened in 5 Oct 1943 until 6 Nov 1943
 Grand National Night – Apollo, 1946 – 1947

TV work
Before the war
Edwardes was an early player in the fledgling BBC television service, which started in November 1936 until it closed at the beginning of the War, and didn't restart until 1946.

::(She was also listed as an announcer on 30 March 1939, until her last appearance on 20 August 1939.

Restarting in 1946

Years 1956–2008

Since her marriage in 1946, she led a new career, as salonnière in the house of Hinton Waldrist manor. Her husband had bought it in 1922, and together they entertained and held court to influential and radical artists, economists, philosophers, and politicians of the day at grand gatherings. Both she and her husband were long-time leading Fabians – she had known Harold Laski for some time. Nicholas Davenport worked with Alexander Korda then joined Harold Wilson with the National Film Finance Corporation. Even though a Fabian, he still kept friend with R. J. G. Boothby and close to Winston Churchill.

Olga Davenport continued the social activity of salon gathering which had been part of history for more than 350 years. "She was, as a young woman, an astounding beauty. She was also an impressive creative force. It is a heady combination. Men chucked caution to the wind."  There is a bust of Olga by the sculptor F. E. McWilliam; two portrait drawings of her in her art collection by Theyre LeeElliott, and another gouache drawing of her dancing also by LeeElliott, with a verse by the artist on the reverse dedicated to her. His was not the only verse inspired by Olga's muse: another was from A. P. Herbert on the train to and back from Frinton-on-Sea.Is he so mad who travels to the shore 
Then back at once to where he was before? 
Does not the ocean under Olga's sway, 
Commit the same sweet folly twice a day? 
Thus the mad fish pursue the moon in vain, 
But will, as happily, pursue again. 
Thus climbers, having made the steep ascent, 
Salute the stars, and then return – content

She had been trained in painting, and returned to that art form following her acting career. In fact when she entered into the theatre, between performances she studied at the Westminster School of Art with Mark Gertler and through him and his wife, met Matthew Smith and Ivon Hitchens. In 1956, following a career as an actor with mostly minor roles in films, she returned to studying fine art and painting at the Chelsea Polytechnic; at the Royal College of Art; and at Peter Lanyon's school in St Ives, Cornwall. Davenport was not merely an accomplished artist, or a collector; but her deep friendships with British artists from the 1950s onwards placed Davenport as a key and perhaps surprisingly influential figure in the British art scene of the time. In St Ives, Davenport was to meet and befriend some of the greatest British artists of the 20th century and during her life she acquired important paintings for her own collection, including works by Patrick Heron, Roger Hilton, Terry Frost, and William Scott. She spent hours at Eagle's Nest, and Elm Tree Cottage. She sat on the board of the Bear Lane Gallery and formed relationships with influential people such as Clement Greenberg and Pauline Vogelpoel. She had a studio in the south of France.

She exhibited with the London Group and with the Women's International Art Club.

She had two one-person shows at the Piccadilly Gallery in London's Cork Street in 1969, and in 1976; and in 1978 she had a solo show of oils at the Oxford Gallery.

Her later work was mainly concerned with the depiction of landscape, and is recognised for the use of gentle, yet dynamic colours which reduce forms to abstracted shapes. She used broad, fluid brushstrokes of colour to capture the outlines of natural environments. The painted landscapes embody a delicate compromise between the wholly self-involved abstraction of modernist formalism and a fascination with the experience and representation of the natural world. Her works are in the permanent collections of the Nuffield Foundation, St Anne's College, Oxford, University of Warwick, Department of the Environment, and in private collections in England, Switzerland, South Africa, Belgium and the United States of America. 

After her death, her art collection auctioned around £550,000.

Notes

References

Sources

External links

National Portrait Gallery  Olga Edwardes 1950
Art UK  Olga Davenport 1915–2008
 New Hall, Cambridge  Olga Davenport
 Arcadja  Works of Olga Davenport

1915 births
2008 deaths
British film actresses
Minimalist artists
People from Cape Town
People from Johannesburg
South African emigrants to the United Kingdom
South African female dancers
South African film actresses
South African stage actresses
South African television actresses